Celtus Dossou Yovo (born 1 April 1986 in Cotonou) is a Beninese judoka.

He competed at the 2016 Summer Olympics in Rio de Janeiro, in the men's 90 kg, where he defeated Célio Dias in the second round but lost to Marcus Nyman in the third round.

He competed at the 2020 Summer Olympics in the men's 90kg. He lost to Russia's Mikhail Igolnikov in the second round.

References

External links
 

1986 births
Living people
Beninese male judoka
Olympic judoka of Benin
Judoka at the 2016 Summer Olympics
Judoka at the 2020 Summer Olympics
People from Cotonou